Khurram Shahzad (b: 1981) is a weightlifter from Pakistan.

Career

2010
Shahzad won a gold medal at the 2010 South Asian Games held in Dhaka, Bangladesh.

He participated in the 2010 Commonwealth Games in New Delhi, India in the 85 kg category.

In 2012 Shahzad was suspended for two years after he failed a drug test.

References

Living people
Pakistani male weightlifters
Weightlifters at the 2010 Commonwealth Games
Doping cases in weightlifting
Year of birth missing (living people)
South Asian Games gold medalists for Pakistan
South Asian Games medalists in weightlifting
Commonwealth Games competitors for Pakistan